The 2019 NCAA Men's National Collegiate Volleyball Tournament was the 50th annual tournament to determine the national champion of NCAA Division I and Division II men's collegiate indoor volleyball. The single-elimination tournament began on April 25 with a play-in match, with the remainder of the tournament hosted by Long Beach State University from April 30 to May 4 at Walter Pyramid in Long Beach.

Bids

Schedule and results
All times Eastern.

Tournament bracket

Game summaries
All times Eastern.

First round

Quarterfinals

Semifinals

National Championship

All-Tournament Team 
Nick Amado – Long Beach State
Simon Andersen – Long Beach State
Colton Cowell – Hawaii
T.J DeFalco – Long Beach State (Most Outstanding Player)
Joe Worsley – Hawaii
Rado Parapunov – Hawaii
Josh Tuaniga – Long Beach State

References

2019
NCAA Men's Volleyball Championship
NCAA Men's Volleyball Championship
2019 in sports in California
2019 NCAA Division I & II men's volleyball season
Volleyball in California